I Love You to Death is a 1990 American black comedy film directed by Lawrence Kasdan and starring an ensemble cast featuring Kevin Kline, Tracey Ullman, Joan Plowright, River Phoenix, William Hurt, and Keanu Reeves.

The screenplay by John Kostmayer is loosely based on an attempted murder that happened in 1983, in Allentown, Pennsylvania, where Frances Toto repeatedly tried to kill her husband, Anthony. She spent four years in prison for attempted murder and was released in 1988.

Plot
Joey Boca is the owner of a pizza parlor located in Tacoma, Washington, and has been married to Rosalie for several years. Their marriage seems a typical one until Rosalie discovers that Joey is a womanizer and has been cheating on her for years with multiple women.

Rosalie does not want to allow Joey the pleasure of having every woman he wants, so she refuses divorce. Taking extreme measures, she enlists the help of her mother and her young co-worker Devo, who is secretly in love with her, to kill Joey. They hire two incompetent, perpetually stoned men, cousins Harlan and Marlon James.

To her surprise, Joey proves impossible to kill. Even though Rosalie heavily doses Joey with sleeping pills, he simply gets a stomach cramp, and dismisses it as a virus. They then ask Devo to come over and shoot Joey, but Devo looks away and only ends up wounding Joey behind the ear. When Marlon's cowardice stops him from being present at Joey's murder, Harlan shoots Joey through the chest, but missing his heart.

Eventually a convict at the local commissary reveals their plan, and when the police arrive they find the wounded Joey in some pain. He is taken to the hospital, and Rosalie, her mother, Devo, and the James cousins are arrested. Seeing the error of his ways and at his mother's behest, Joey refuses to press charges and bails everyone out of jail. As he waits for Rosalie with flowers and a box of chocolates, he meets the James cousins and makes peace. Seeing Rosalie again, he asks her to take him back, but still offended, she runs out. Joey catches her and in the janitors' closet they reveal their love with some intimacy, much to Devo's dismay and the surprise of Rosalie's mother.

Cast

Release
The film earned $4 million on its opening weekend and grossed over $16 million in North America.

Reception
I Love You to Death received mixed reviews. 
On Metacritic, the film has a weighted average score of 45 out of 100 based on reviews from 13 critics, indicating "mixed or average reviews". Audiences surveyed by CinemaScore gave the film a grade C on scale of A to F.

Jonathan Rosenbaum, writing for the Chicago Sun-Times, described the film as a "fair-to-middling black comedy" and that "although the pacing is sluggish in spots, people with a taste for acting as impersonation will enjoy some of the scenery chewing—especially by Plowright, Kline, and Hurt".

Roger Ebert describes the film as "an actor's dream" but isn't quite so sure it is a dream film for an audience. He praises Ullman for her performance, noting it is all the more effective against the overtly comic performance of Kline. Ebert remarks "William Hurt could have walked through the role of the spaced-out hit man, but takes the time to make the character believable and even, in a bleary way, complex". Ebert suggests Kasdan was attracted to the script because it seems almost impossible to direct, and although he is not sure it succeeds, it is certainly not boring.

References

External links
 
 
 
 

1990 films
1990s English-language films
1990s Italian-language films
Serbo-Croatian-language films
1990s crime comedy-drama films
American black comedy films
American crime comedy-drama films
Films scored by James Horner
Adultery in films
Films about dysfunctional families
Mariticide in fiction
American films about revenge
American films based on actual events
Films directed by Lawrence Kasdan
Films shot in Washington (state)
TriStar Pictures films
1990s black comedy films
Italian-language American films
1990s American films